Out of My Hands is the seventh studio album by American singer Jennifer Rush. It was released by Electrola on February 9, 1995. Commercially, the album improved on Rush's previous one by reaching number 15 on the German Albums Chart during a four-month chart run. Out of My Hands was led by single "Tears in the Rain," a song originally recorded by Robin Beck. "Tears in the Rain" became Rush's biggest single of the decade, charting highly in many European countries, particularly in Germany. A second single was released, the title track "Out of My Hands", while the album boasted a collaboration with Brian May on the Queen cover "Who Wants to Live Forever," which was released as a promo-only single.

Track listing

Charts

Weekly charts

Year-end charts

References

External links

1995 albums
Jennifer Rush albums
EMI Records albums